Ropalospora is a genus of lichen-forming fungi, and the sole member of the monogeneric family Ropalosporaceae. The genus was circumscribed by Italian lichenologist Abramo Bartolommeo Massalongo in 1860. The family was proposed by Josef Hafellner in 1984.

Species
Ropalospora atroumbrina 
Ropalospora caffra 
Ropalospora chirisanensis 
Ropalospora chlorantha 
Ropalospora hibernica 
Ropalospora lugubris 
Ropalospora phaeoplaca 
Ropalospora rossii 
Ropalospora viridis

References

Umbilicariales
Lichen genera
Lecanoromycetes genera
Taxa named by Abramo Bartolommeo Massalongo
Taxa described in 1860